Marco Bulacia Wilkinson (born 27 September 2000) is a Bolivian rally driver. He currently partners with co-driver [[Diego Vallejo
]] in the WRC-2 category. His younger brother Bruno is a rally driver also.

Rally career
Bulacia Wilkinson made his WRC debut in 2018 Rally Mexico, driving a Ford Fiesta R5. In 2019 Rally Mexico, he scored his first WRC points.

Rally results

WRC results
 
* Season still in progress.

WRC-2 results

* Season still in progress.

WRC-2 Pro results

WRC-3 results

References

External links
 Marco Bulacia Wilkinson's e-wrc profile

2000 births
Living people
Bolivian rally drivers
World Rally Championship drivers
Toksport WRT drivers
Škoda Motorsport drivers